Anna Katherine Popplewell (born 16 December 1988) is an English stage actress. Popplewell is known for playing Susan Pevensie in the fantasy film series The Chronicles of Narnia (2005–2010), that earned her a number of accolades.

Aside from her The Chronicles of Narnia role, Popplewell played the role of Chyler Silva in the web series Halo 4: Forward Unto Dawn (2012) which is based on the video game of the same name, and starred as Lady Lola in the historical romantic drama series Reign (2013–2016), which was her first leading role in a television series.

Early life
Popplewell, the oldest of three children, is the daughter of the Court of Appeal judge Andrew Popplewell and Debra Lomas, a dermatologist who studied at Newnham College Cambridge. She was born in London. Her siblings are actress Lulu Popplewell, who starred as Daisy in Love Actually, and Freddie Popplewell, who starred as Michael Darling in the film Peter Pan. Her paternal grandfather, Sir Oliver Popplewell, is a former judge, and her uncle is former cricketer Nigel Popplewell.

She attended North London Collegiate School and was a senior student in 2006–07. She was admitted to Oxford University in 2007 where she studied English Language and Literature at Magdalen College.

Career

Popplewell began acting at the age of six, taking classes at the Allsorts Drama School. She began acting professionally in the TV production Frenchman's Creek in 1998. She made her film debut in 1999 in the film Mansfield Park, and followed up with supporting roles in the films The Little Vampire (2000) and Girl with a Pearl Earring (2003), with Scarlett Johansson. In 2001, she appeared as Victoria in the BBC serial Love in a Cold Climate.

Her first major role was in the film The Chronicles of Narnia: The Lion, the Witch and the Wardrobe (2005) where she played Susan Pevensie at the age of 15. She has a fear of mice, requiring a double to undertake part of her scene at the Stone Table in The Lion, the Witch, and the Wardrobe. She reprised her role in the sequel, The Chronicles of Narnia: Prince Caspian (2008), in which she acted with William Moseley, Skandar Keynes, Georgie Henley and Ben Barnes. She also made a cameo appearance in the third Narnia film, The Chronicles of Narnia: The Voyage of the Dawn Treader (2010).

In 2012, she played the character Chyler Silva in the live action 5-part mini series Halo 4: Forward Unto Dawn. In 2013, Popplewell played Lola, a friend of Mary, Queen of Scots, in the CW television series Reign. Filming took place in Ireland and Canada. She played the role until 2016, when her character was killed off in the season 3 finale.

Beginning in 2018, Poppelwell has narrated the audiobooks Dear Mrs. Bird and its sequel Yours, Cheerfully for Simon & Schuster Audio, London's Number One Dog-Walking Agency, for HarperAudio, and Queen of Coin and Whispers for Bolinda Publishing Pty Ltd.

Filmography

Awards and nominations

Theatre

References

External links

 

Living people
20th-century English actresses
21st-century English actresses
Actresses from London
Alumni of Magdalen College, Oxford
English child actresses
English film actresses
English television actresses
English stage actresses
People from Finchley
People educated at North London Collegiate School
Year of birth missing (living people)